The Independent Peasants (PI) were a political party in French Cameroons.

History
The party contested the 1956 Territorial Assembly elections. It received 9.6% of the vote, winning 8 of the 70 seats.

References

Defunct political parties in Cameroon
Political parties with year of establishment missing
Political parties with year of disestablishment missing